William Shapleigh Damrell (November 29, 1809 – May 17, 1860) was a member of the United States House of Representatives from Massachusetts.

Career
Damrell was born in Portsmouth, New Hampshire on November 29, 1809. He attended  public schools, learned the art of printing and became the proprietor of a large printing establishment in Boston.  He published books, almanacs, and government publications of all types, but was primarily known for printing books, broadsides and pamphlets for temperance and other reform organizations.  He also became the city's main supplier of stationery and office supplies.

He was active in the Free Soil Party.  In 1854 he was elected to the Thirty-fourth Congress as a Free Soiler with American Party support (March 4, 1855 – March 3, 1857).  He was reelected as a Republican to the Thirty-fifth Congress (March 4, 1857 – March 3, 1859).

Damrell suffered a paralytic stroke before the expiration of his second term, and was not a candidate for renomination in 1858.  He resumed his printing business activities.

Death and burial

He died in Dedham on May 17, 1860.  His interment was at Forest Hills Cemetery in the Jamaica Plain neighborhood of Boston, Massachusetts.

In 1892 his former estate was purchased and converted into the Fairview Cemetery.

Family
Damrell was married to Adeline A. Naef (1807-1880).  Their children included: Lucius Manlius Sargent Damrell (1833-1872); Catherine Shapley Damrell Gowland (1835-1860); William Shapleigh Damrell (1838-1873); Andrew Naef Damrell (1840-1909); and Horace Sargent Damrell (1842-1862).

External links
 

1809 births
1860 deaths
Politicians from Portsmouth, New Hampshire
Know-Nothing members of the United States House of Representatives from Massachusetts
Republican Party members of the United States House of Representatives from Massachusetts
19th-century American politicians
Politicians from Dedham, Massachusetts